Kolejarz Rawicz (Railwayman Rawicz) is a motorcycle speedway team based in Rawicz, Poland. They currently race in the Polish Speedway Second League (2. Liga).

History
The club competed in the inaugural 1948 Polish speedway season, under the name of Motoklub Rawicz.

The club's first team honour was winning the bronze medal in the Team Speedway Polish Championship in 1954 and the following season they went one better after winning the silver medal in 1955. Their leading rider Florian Kapała won the Polish Individual Speedway Championship in 1953 and 1956.

The club was disbanded after the 1959 season and was not reformed until 1996. 

The club later won the Polish Speedway Second League three times in 2000, 2007 and 2012.

In 2008, the club renamed their stadium to the Florian Kapała Stadium, named after a former rider Florian Kapała. The stadium has a capacity of 7,000 and the speedway track is 330 metres long.

Teams

2023 team
 Scott Nicholls
 Hans Andersen
 Damian Dróżdż
 Nikodem Bartoch
 Tomasz Orwat
 Ryan Douglas
 Drew Kemp
 Jye Etheridge
 Steven Goret
 Damian Baliński
 Kacper Klosok
 Hubert Gasior
 Kacper Klimek
 Franciszek Majewski
 Blazej Wypior

Previous teams

2022 team

 Daniel Kaczmarek
 Damian Dróżdż
 Josh Pickering
 Ryan Douglas
 Tom Brennan
 Sam Masters
 Kacper Klosok
 Krzystof Sadurski
 Damian Baliński
 Wiktor Przyjemski

Notable riders

References 

Polish speedway teams